(born March 15, 1969, in  Kyoto, Kyoto) is a Japanese jockey. 
A legend in Japan, Yutaka Take made his riding debut in 1987 and currently holds seven all-time records in his native country. Take has won at least one Grade 1 races for 23 straight years until 2010 and a graded stakes race for 36 consecutive years.  Take has also shown his abilities abroad. He has 114 wins to his credit in eight countries, including Australia, France, Germany, Hong Kong, Korea, United Arab Emirates, United Kingdom, and the United States. A sampling of his international victories includes Group 1 wins in the Prix d'Ispahan (France) and Hong Kong Cup (Hong Kong), two races timed by Longines, the July Cup (England) and Dubai Duty Free Stakes (UAE).

Early life 

Yutaka was born in Kyoto on March 15, 1969, to Kunihiko and Yoko Take. Kunihiko was also a notable jockey nicknamed "The wizard of the turf" during his prime. Take would ultimately follow his father's footsteps, and make his debut as a jockey in 1987.

Career 
In 1987 he became the first rookie to ride 69 winners in one season. In the following year he became the youngest jockey to achieve 100 wins and won the GI race. Two years later, he was named the overall champion jockey by the JRA, and Take held that title continuously until 1999, with the exception of 1991. 
      
In 2005 he achieved the feat of winning the Japanese Triple Crown of Thoroughbred Racing (Satsuki Sho, Tokyo Yushun, Kikuka Sho) with Deep Impact, which is the second undefeated horse that has won the classic. That same year, Take also achieved 212 victories in total, which would be the most victories any jockey has had in a single year.

On March 25, 2007, Yutaka Take won the Takamatsunomiya Kinen at Chukyo Racecourse aboard Suzuka Phoenix. The win gave Take a Group One victory for the 20th consecutive racing season.  Also in 2007, Take won his fourth Japan Cup Dirt in seven years.
Yutaka Take was the recipient of the 2017 Longines and IFHA International Award of Merit, which recognizes distinguished horsemen and horsewomen for lifelong contributions to Thoroughbred racing. He was the first jockey to win that award.

Take has also made appearances in equine related TV shows and commercials over the years, including a collaboration ad between the JRA and Neon Genesis Evangelion; as well as several commercials of Uma Musume Pretty Derby, of which Take has also made a cameo appearance in the anime adaptation.

Personal life 
Aside from Kunihiko, the Take family is known as a horseracing family. Most notably, Yutaka's brother, Koshiro, was also a jockey before transitioning to a trainer. 

In 1995, Yutaka married , a former tarento.

Major wins
 Great Britain
 July Cup - (1) - Agnes World (2000)

 France
 Prix d'Ispahan - (1) - A Shin Hikari (2016)
 Prix de l'Abbaye de Longchamp - (2) - Agnes World (1999), Imperial Beauty (2001)
 Prix du Moulin de Longchamp - (1) - Ski Paradise (1994)
 Prix Maurice de Gheest - (1) - Seeking the Pearl (1998)

 Hong Kong
 Hong Kong Cup - (1) - A Shin Hikari (2015)
 Hong Kong Vase - (1) - Stay Gold (2001)

 Japan
 Arima Kinen - (3) - Oguri Cap (1990), Deep Impact (2006), Kitasan Black (2017)
 Asahi Hai Futurity Stakes - (1) - Do Deuce (2021)
 Derby Grand Prix - (2) - Gold Allure (2002), Kane Hekili (2005) February Stakes - (5) - Gold Allure (2003), Kane Hekili (2006), Vermillion (2007), Copano Rickey (2015), Inti (2019) Hanshin Sansai Himba Stakes - (1) - Yamanin Paradise (1994) Japan Breeding farm's Cup Classic - (8) - Time Paradox (2005), Vermillion (2007 & 2008 & 2009), Smart Falcon (2010 & 2011), Copano Rickey (2015), Awardee (2016) Japan Breeding farm's Cup Sprint - (1) - Meiner Select (2004) Japan Cup - (4) - Special Week (1998), Deep Impact (2006), Rose Kingdom (2010), Kitasan Black (2016) Japan Cup Dirt - (4) - Kurofune (2001), Time Paradox (2004), Kane Hekili (2005), Vermillion (2007) Japan Dirt Derby - (4) - Gold Allure (2002), Big Wolf (2003), Kane Hekili (2005), Notturno（2022） Kawasaki Kinen - (3) - Time Paradox (2005), Vermillion (2010), Smart Falcon (2012) Kashiwa Kinen - (2) - Copano Rickey (2016 & 2017) Kikuka Shō - (4) - Super Creek (1988), Dance in the Dark (1996), Air Shakur (2000), Deep Impact (2005),World Premiere (2019) Mile Championship - (2) - Sadamu Patek (2012), Tosen Ra (2013) Mile Championship Nambu Hai - (1) - Nihon Pillow Jupiter (1999) NHK Mile Cup - (3) - Seeking the Pearl (1997), Kurofune (2001), Logic (2006) Oka Sho - (5) - Shadai Kagura (1989), Vega (1993), Oguri Roman (1994), Phalaenopsis (1998), Dance in the Mood (2004) Osaka Hai - (1) - Kitasan Black (2017) Queen Elizabeth II Commemorative Cup - (4) - To the Victory (2001), Fine Motion (2002), Admire Groove (2003 & 2004) Satsuki Shō - (3) - Narita Taishin (1993), Air Shakur (2000), Deep Impact (2005) Shuka Sho - (3) - Phalaenopsis (1998), Fine Motion (2002), Air Messiah (2005) Sprinters Stakes - (2) - Bamboo Memory (1990), Believe (2002) Takamatsunomiya Kinen - (2) - Admire Max (2005), Suzuka Phoenix (2007) Takarazuka Kinen - (4) - Inari One (1989), Mejiro McQueen (1993), Marvelous Sunday (1997), Deep Impact (2006) Teio Sho - (5) - Time Paradox (2005), Vermillion (2009), Smart Falcon (2011), Wonder Acute (2014), Copano Rickey (2016) Tenno Sho Autumn - (6) - Super Creek (1989), Air Groove (1997), Special Week (1999), Meisho Samson (2007), Vodka (2008), Kitasan Black (2017) Tenno Sho Spring - (8) - Inari One (1989), Super Creek (1990), Mejiro McQueen (1991 & 1992), Special Week (1999), Deep Impact (2006), Kitasan Black(2016 & 2017) Tokyo Daishōten - (5) - Gold Allure (2002), Star King Man (2003), Vermillion (2007), Smart Falcon (2010 & 2011) Tokyo Yūshun - (6) - Special Week (1998), Admire Vega (1999), Tanino Gimlet (2002), Deep Impact (2005), Kizuna (2013), Do Deuce (2022) Victoria Mile - (1) - Vodka (2009) Yasuda Kinen - (3) - Oguri Cap (1990), Heart Lake (1995), Vodka (2009) Yushun Himba - (3) - Vega (1993), Dance Partner (1995), Air Groove (1996) Zen-Nippon Nisai Yushun - (1) - Admire Hope (2003) United Arab Emirates
 Dubai Sheema Classic - (1) - Stay Gold (2001) Dubai Duty Free Stakes - (1) - Admire Moon (2007)''

Year-end charts in the United States

References

External links
 Yutaka Take - NTRA

1969 births
Living people
Japanese jockeys
People from Shiga Prefecture